The 2012 John Newcombe Women's Pro Challenge was a professional tennis tournament played on outdoor hard courts. It was the first edition of the tournament which was part of the 2012 ITF Women's Circuit. It took place in New Braunfels, Texas, United States, on 29 October–4 November 2012.

WTA entrants

Seeds 

 1 Rankings are as of 22 October 2012.

Other entrants 
The following players received wildcards into the singles main draw:
  Rosalia Alda
  Victoria Duval
  Yasmin Schnack

The following players received entry from the qualifying draw:
  Lauren Albanese
  Sanaz Marand
  Jelena Pandžić
  Taylor Townsend

The following players received entry as Lucky Losers:
  Natalie Pluskota
  Romana Tedjakusuma

Champions

Singles 

  Melanie Oudin def.  Mariana Duque 6–1, 6–1.

Doubles 

  Elena Bovina /  Mirjana Lučić def.  Mariana Duque /  Adriana Pérez 6–3, 4–6, [10–8].

External links 
 2012 John Newcombe Women's Pro Challenge at ITFTennis.com

John Newcombe Women's Pro Challenge
Hard court tennis tournaments in the United States